Mariana Savka, also spelled Maryana Savka (born February 21, 1973, in Kopychyntsi) is a Ukrainian poet, children's writer, translator and a publisher. In 2003 she was awarded the Vasyl Stus Award.

Early life and education 
Mariana Savka was born on 21 February 1973 in Kopychyntsi. Her father, Orest Savka, was a theater director and an activist. Mariana holds a degree in Ukrainian studies from the Ivan Franko National University of Lviv. During her studies, she co-created an all-female literary group ММЮННА ТУГА with Marianna Kiyanovska, Natalka Sniadanko and others. She also studied at the drama studio of the Les Kurbas Theatre in Lviv.

Career 
She worked as a researcher at the Stefanyk National Science Library which led to her publishing a work on Ukrainian emigrant press in the First Czechoslovak Republic. In the 1990s she also contributed to the literature section of the Postup daily. In 2001 she founded with her husband a publishing house called Vydavnytstvo Staroho Leva ("Old Lion’s Publishing House") which initially focused on children's and young adult literature, then expanded into literature for adults. She is the editor-in-chief of the company.

She debuted in 1995 with poetry book Оголені русла. Her works have appeared in various newspapers and magazines, such as Suchasnist`, Svitovyd, Kuryer Kryvbasu, Chetver, and the Ukrainian Quarterly, and have been featured in anthologies, including Метаморфози. Десять найкращих українських поетів останніх десятих років (Metamorphoses. Top Ten Ukrainian Poets of the Last Decade). Her works have been translated into seven languages including English, Russian and Polish. Apart from writing, Savka is also a composer and a singer in Maryanychi Trio, for which she has written over 30 songs. She also works as a translator.

Savka is s a member of PEN Ukraine and of the Council of the Center for the Study of Literature for Children and Youth. She serves as the United Nations Development Programme Tolerance Ambassador in Ukraine and is the vice-president of the Big Hedgehog literary prize: the first non-governmental literary award in Ukraine dedicated to honoring authors of books for children and youth.

In 1998, Savka won in the Fackel literature competition and in 2003 she was awarded the Vasyl Stus Award.

Publications

For children 

 Чи є в бабуїна бабуся? (Does the Baboon Have a Grandma?), 2003
 Лапи і хвости (Paws and Tails), 2005
 Казка про Старого Лева (Fairy Tale about an Old Lion), 2011
 Босоніжки для стоніжки (Sandals for the Centipede), 2015
 На болоті (At the Swamp), 2015
 Тихі віршики на зиму (Silent Poems for Winter), 2015

For adults 

 Оголені русла (Bare Channels), 1995
 Малюнки на камені (Paintings on the Stone), 1998
 Гірка мандрагора (Bitter Mandrake), 2002
 Кохання і війна (Love and War), 2002
 Квіти цмину (Strawflowers), 2006
 Бостон-джаз: візії та вірші (Boston-Jazz: Visions and Poems), 2008
 Тінь риби (Shadow of Fish), 2010
 Пора плодів і квітів (Time of Fruit and Flowers), 2013
 Листи з Литви / Листи зі Львова (Letters from Lithuania / Letters from Lviv), 2016
 Колисанки і дрімливі вірші (Lullabies and Somnolent Poems), 2017

References

External links 
 For the Record: Marjana Savka, June 9, 2022

Ukrainian translators
Ukrainian women poets
21st-century Ukrainian women writers
Ukrainian children's writers
Ukrainian publishers (people)
University of Lviv alumni
People from Kopychyntsi
1973 births
Living people